Babli Bouncer is a 2022 Indian Hindi-language drama film directed by Madhur Bhandarkar starring Tamannaah. It premiered on 23 September 2022 on Disney+ Hotstar.

Plot 
Babli Tanwar (Tamannaah Bhatia) is an uneducated young girl from Asola Fatepur, a small village near Delhi, where most people are bouncers. Despite being of a marriageable age, Babli still hasn't finished her 10th-grade education, and her teacher (nicknamed "Drum") is very upset with her and looks down upon her. Babli has also trained to be a bouncer since childhood.

At the wedding of a local couple, Babli meets Drum's son Viraj Kaushik (Abhishek Bajaj), who recently returned from London after five years of study. Babli develops a crush on him and tries to get close to him. As Viraj lives in Delhi, Babli plans to go to Delhi to see him. At the same time, Babli starts to receive marriage proposals. Babli manages to turn all of them down as she likes Viraj.

Babli's friend since childhood Kukku (Sahil Vaid), who has long had a crush on her, learns she is receiving marriage proposals and feels insecure. So he and his family bring his marriage proposal to Babli's family too. Babli's family likes Kukku but she considers him as a friend. After realising that Kukku works as a bouncer at a nightclub in Delhi, Babli decides to use him to get herself to Delhi. She pretends to like Kukku and asks him to get her a job in Delhi at first, and tells him they can discuss their marriage after a year. Kukku's nightclub happened to be hiring a female bouncer, so he referred her to his club, and she got the job.

In Delhi, Babli meets Viraj several times. At Viraj's birthday party, drunk Babli confesses to Viraj her feeling for him. Viraj rejects Babli and insults her for being uneducated and uncivil. Babli gets heartbroken and cuts her ties with Viraj. Upon hearing Viraj's words, Babli decides to change herself and improve her social status, not to impress Viraj but for herself.

She enrols in a class to continue her education, learns English, and gradually progresses.

Viraj and his friends visit Babli's club, during which he quarrels with the playboy son of a high-profile politician. The playboy points a gun at Viraj's head and threatens to kill him. Babli arrives at the scene and is able to solve it peacefully with her courage and brain. Viraj becomes very impressed and regrets rejecting her. He begins to chase her, trying to win back her heart. Babli tries to avoid him a few times and finally rejects him, telling him she no longer loves him.

Another night at the club, gangsters sneakily abduct a female customer. They force her into their car and flee, planning to rape or kill her. Babli happens to see the incident and decides to save the girl. She defeats all the gangsters on the road and saves the girl. The incident is reported by the media and Babli suddenly becomes very famous and popular. The Chief Minister of her State publicly awarded her a medal of bravery.

With the help of a wealthy customer whom Babli saved before, she opens her training centre to train female bouncers who want to follow her step.

Cast 
 Tamannaah Bhatia as Babli Tanwar (Babli Bouncer)
 Abhishek Bajaj as Viraj Kaushik
 Sahil Vaid as Kukku
 Saanand Verma as Jaggi Paaji
 Saurabh Shukla as Gajanan Tanwar, Babli's father
 Sabyasachi Chakrabarty as Saurav Dutta (Uncle Ji)
 Mukesh Tyagi as Tyagiji Bar Owner
 Karan Singh Chhabra as Mannu
 Supriya Shukla as Ganga Tanwar, Babli's mother
 Khabir Mehta as Golu Tanwar, Babli's brother
 Upasna Singh as Dolly Chaddha
 Ashwini Kalsekar as Bobby, coach of Bouncers
 Rajesh Khera as Inspector Amarnath Singh
 Priyam Saha as Pinky "Pinku", Babli's friend
 Anushka Lohar as Natasha "Nats"

Production

Casting 
In February 2022, Tamannaah was confirmed to be cast in lead role as a female bouncer. In the same month, Abhishek Bajaj was confirmed to be a part of the cast.

Development 
The film was announced in February 2022. The makers of the film arranged an muhurat puja for the team after the filming started.

Filming 
The principal photography of the film started in mid-February 2022. The first schedule took place at Mohali, Punjab with an outdoor shoot, followed by New Delhi and was completed within 20 days. The final schedule took place in Mumbai from 22 April 2022. The film was wrapped up on 5 May 2022 in Mumbai.

Music 

The songs are composed by Tanishk Bagchi and Karan Malhotra. The lyrics are written by Tanishk Bagchi, Shabbir Ahmed and Manaswi Mohata.

Release 
Babli Bouncer was directly premiered on OTT platform Disney+ Hotstar on 23 September 2022.

References

External links 
 
 

2022 films
2022 drama films
Indian drama films
Star Studios films
Disney India films
2020s Hindi-language films
Disney+ Hotstar original films
Films directed by Madhur Bhandarkar